Huisheng Ai (Chinese: 艾辉胜, born in 1958) is the current director of both the Hematology and Radiation Therapy Departments of the 307th Hospital of Chinese People’s Liberation Army. He joined the hospital in 1983. After a short time working in various departments, he settled in the radiation and homeopathy departments, the most revered in the hospital. Huisheng Ai, Guo Mei, and the medical team developed microtransplantation treatment for leukemia.

Education
Huisheng Ai got his master's degree from Second Military Medical University.

Honors
Huisheng Ai was honored with Second National Youth Star of Medical Science in 1996.

In 2004 and 2005, Ai got second-class Merit.

In 2006, Huisheng Ai was awarded with the title of Silver Star of Science and Technology.

Other leadership
Huisheng Ai is a member of EGIL (European group for the Immunological classification of Leukemia). He serves as a member of Chinese Society of Clinical Oncology. At the end of 2012, at the invitation of Blood, Ai became a member on its editorial board.

Academic papers

References
http://www.newcelltech.com/a/jszj/sxzj/20120919/1.html；
http://www.chinapictorial.com.cn/en/people/txt/2015-01/05/content_662427_2.htm；
http://www.researchgate.net/profile/Huisheng_Ai；

1958 births
Living people